The fourth cycle of Holland's Next Top Model premiered on 31 March 2008 on RTL5. This was the second cycle of the series to be hosted by Dutch model Daphne Deckers. All of the previous season's judges returned for the new cycle, with the exception of Glamour magazine editor Karin Swerink, who was replaced by Grazia magazine editor Hilmar Mulder.

The prizes for this cycle included a modelling contract with Modelmasters The Agency valued at €75,000, a cover feature for Grazia magazine, replacing the sponsorship of the show's previous magazine, Glamour, a four-month contract to be the new face of the  ICI Paris XL beauty channel, and a brand new Citroën sponsored by ICI Paris XL.

The winner of the competition was 19-year-old Ananda Lândertine from Wormer, North Holland.

Following the conclusion of this cycle, production began on a joint Dutch-Belgian adaptation of the show, which was titled Benelux' Next Top Model. After a two-year run, production for Holland's Next Top Model resumed in 2011 with a fifth cycle.

Cast

Contestants
(Ages stated are at start of contest)

Judges
 Daphne Deckers (host)
 Rosalie van Breemen
 Hilmar Mulder
 Philip Riches
 Mariana Verkerk

Other cast members
 Bastiaan van Schaik - mentor
 Thijs Willekes - mentor

Episodes

Results

 The contestant was eliminated outside of judging panel
 The contestant was put through collectively to the next round
 The contestant quit the competition
 The contestant was eliminated
 The contestant was part of a non-elimination bottom two 
 The contestant won the competition

Final scores

Notes

References

External links
Official website  (archive at the Wayback Machine)

Holland's Next Top Model
2008 Dutch television seasons